Arana is a surname that originates in Spain. Notable people with the surname include:

Agustín Arana (born 1968), Mexican actor
Agustín Sauto Arana (1908–1986), Basque footballer
Alejandro Arana (born 1997), Mexican footballer
Alfonso Arana (1927–2005), Puerto Rican painter
Álvaro de Arana (1904–1937), Spanish sailor
Beatriz Enríquez de Arana (1467–1536), Spanish woman who was the mistress of Christopher Columbus
Carlos Manuel Arana Osorio (1918–2003), former president of Guatemala
Diego Barros Arana (1830–1907), Chilean historian
Diego de Arana (1468–1493), Castillan sailor
Ezequiel Arana (born 1986), Spanish footballer
Facundo Arana (born 1972), Argentinian actor
Fernando Ortíz Arana (born 1944), Mexican politician
Francisco Infante-Arana (born 1943), Russian artist
Francisco Javier Arana (1905–1949), Guatemalan military leader
Gabriel Arana (born 1983), American journalist
Guilherme Arana (born 1997), Brazilian footballer
Hector Arana, American motorcycle racer
Henry Arana (1921–2008), Puerto Rican composer
Hugo Arana (born 1943), Argentinian actor
Iván Arana, Mexican actor
Javier de Arana (1905–1975), Spanish sailor
Juan Antonio de Urrutia y Arana, colonial Mexican nobleman
Julio César Arana (1894–1952), Peruvian entrepreneur and politician
Jorge Arana Arana (born 1960), Mexican politician
José Manuel Fortuny Arana (1916–2005), Guatemalan politician
Lucrecia Arana (1871–1927), Spanish opera singer
Luis Arana (1862–1951), Basque Nationalist Party leader after Sabino Arana's death 
Luis de Arana (1874–1951), Spanish sailor
Manuel Arana (born 1984), Spanish footballer
Mariano Arana (born 1933), Uruguayan architect and politician
Maribel Arana (born 1985), Guatemalan model
Marie Arana, Peruvian-American writer, novelist, literary critic
Mario Germán Iguarán Arana (born 1960), Colombian lawyer
Michelle Arana (born 1969), Belizean judge
Óscar de Marcos Arana (born 1989), Spanish footballer
Ronald Arana (born 1977), Bolivian footballer
Ryan Araña, Filipino basketball player
Sabino Arana (1865–1903), founder of political Basque nationalism
Sandra Arana (born 1973), American-Peruvian actress, model, and television presenter
Tomas Arana (born 1955), American actor
Txe Arana (born 1972), Catalan actor

Basque-language surnames